Phoebus of Lusignan (died after July 1485 in Rome) (also called Febo or Febos in Portuguese) was a titular Marshal of Armenia and also titular Lord of Sidon, the illegitimate son of Peter of Lusignan, titular  Count of Tripoli.

Biography
His father Peter of Lusignan was the grandson of John of Lusignan and second wife Alice of Ibelin. Phoebus was legitimized by Pope Martin V in 1428, along with his cousin Guy de Lusignan, illegitimate son of King Janus of Cyprus.

Married to an unknown woman, he was the father of one son and one daughter.

His son Hugh of Lusignan (d. after 1468), Lord of Menico and Acaqui, was married firstly to ... Babin and secondly to Isabeau Placoton, with whom he had two daughters:
Isabella of Lusignan, married to Very Embriaco de Giblet, Lord of Makrassika.
Lucrèce of Lusignan, married to Olivier de Flatre.

His daughter Elèonore, also Leonor (in Portuguese), of Lusignan (d. Lisbon, ca 1475, and buried there) also married twice.  In the 1450s (1450/1455 according to some or 1451/1452 according to others) to Soffredo Crispo (d. 1458), Lord of Nisyros, of the Dukes of Naxos was without issue.  Her second marriage was before 1459 as second wife to Vasco Gil Moniz, with whom she had one son, Febo (or Febos) Moniz de Lusignan or Febo (or Febos) Moniz.  Eleonore was said to have come from Aragon as a Dame of Isabella of Urgell, Duchess of Coimbra, wife of Infante Pedro, Duke of Coimbra.   She most likely met her husband when he went to Cyprus in the company of John of Portugal, who was marrying Queen Charlotte of Cyprus.

Since he died at the same place and about the same time of his cousin Queen Charlotte it can be assumed that when she was deposed by her brother he chose not to endorse him and instead accompanied her to her exile and died there. His daughter went to Portugal back with her husband either when his master Charlotte's first husband was murdered or, after deciding to stay after that event, when his master's widow was deposed and at the same time Phoebus left Cyprus, returning to his country instead of going to Rome with him.

References
Manuel João da Costa Felgueiras Gaio, "Nobiliário das Famílias de Portugal", Tomo Vigésimo Primeiro, Título de Monizes, § 17–19
Various authors, "Armorial Lusitano", p. 370-2, Lisbon, 1961
Dom Augusto Romano Sanches de Baena e Farinha de Almeida Portugal da Silva e Sousa, 1.° Visconde de Sanches de Baena, "Archivo Heraldico-Genealógico", Volume II, p. CXV, Lisbon, 1872
Cristóvão Alão de Morais, "Pedatura Lusitana", Volume I (reformulated edition), p. 668-70

Lordship of Sidon
House of Lusignan
15th-century births
15th-century deaths
Cypriot people of Armenian descent